Khairo Bhatti is a town in the Sindh province of Pakistan. It is located at 28.9°N 68.27°E with an altitude of 54 metres (180 feet).

References

Populated places in Sindh